Nancy Manter (born 1951 Bangor, Maine) is an American artist and photographer. Her work is included in the collections of the Whitney Museum of American Art, the Metropolitan Museum of Art MoMA, The Phillips Collection, and the Smithsonian American Art Museum.

References

External links
 Official website

1951 births
Living people
20th-century American artists
20th-century American women photographers
20th-century American photographers
21st-century American women photographers
21st-century American photographers
Artists from Bangor, Maine